Gummalam is a 2002 Tamil-language film. Sugi S. Moorthy directed this film with newcomers Mithun Tejaswi, Rathi, Akash, Ganesh and Zakeer.

Cast
Mithun Tejaswi as Dinesh
R. Ganesh as Sekhar 
Adithya as Uncle 
Zakeer as Iyyappan 
Rathi as Anu
Kazan Khan
Vineetha
Kaka Radhakrishnan
Ponnambalam
Vasu Vikram
Ravikumar
Selvam
Murali Mohan
Typist Gopu
Kavitha

Production
Two of the songs were shot at Rameswaram and Udhagamandalam.This is the renowned colorist G Balaji's first film.

Soundtrack
Soundtrack was composed by Gandhidasan.
"Thitranga" – Tippu
"Kaatre" – Sujatha
"Yaaro" – Unni Menon
"Dhimsukattai" – Timmy
"Ovvoru Naalum" – Unnikrishnan

Reception
Thiraipadam wrote "For the most part, Gummaalam reminds us of other recent movies featuring students and their activities. It features four such students and has them fighting over one woman. But the movie ventures into serious territory by giving the woman a sad, serious past. Not only do the two portions of the movie not gel, but the serious portion is too haphazard to make up for the distasteful and vulgar portions involving the four students". The Hindu wrote "And if the story hardly affects you at any point, it is the treatment which leaves much to be desired". Visual Dasan of Kalki wrote while the refugee camp flashback at the end of the vibrant film has more density and depth, Vinita's character and the imposed songs are occasional reminders that Kummalam is commercial cinema.

References

External links
 http://www.cinesouth.com/cgi-bin/filmography/newfilmdb.cgi?name=gummalam 

2002 films
2000s Tamil-language films
2000s coming-of-age drama films
Indian coming-of-age drama films
2002 directorial debut films